Aleix García Pujolar (born 10 June 2000, in Girona) is a Spanish rower. He won the silver medal in the double sculls at the 2022 European Rowing Championships.

References

External links

2000 births
Living people
Spanish male rowers
Sportspeople from Girona
World Rowing Championships medalists for Spain
21st-century Spanish people